Beyond Reality is the 2002 debut album of Dreamtale. Marko Hietala from Nightwish and vocalist Tarot sings on track number 4 and 5. Sanna Natunen sings for the tracks Silent Path and Farewell.

Track listing 
"Intro: The Dawn" - 4:06
"Memories of Time" - 4:47
"Fallen Star" - 4:46
"Heart's Desire" (feat. Marko Hietala) - 8:10
"Where the Rainbow Ends" (feat. Marko Hietala) - 5:05
"Time of Fatherhood" - 5:30
"Dreamland" - 3:39
"Call of the Wild" - 5:25
"Dancing in the Twilight" - 5:24
"Refuge from Reality" - 4:49
"Silent Path" - 4:53
"Farewell..." - 7:16
"Secret Wish" (Japanese bonus track) - 3:53

External links
 ProgressiveWorld.net review of the album

2002 debut albums
Dreamtale albums
Spinefarm Records albums